José Rodolfo Chessani García (born on 23 November 1998) is a Mexican Paralympic athlete. He made his maiden Paralympic appearance representing Mexico at the 2020 Summer Paralympics, where he clinched the gold medal in the men's T38 400m event.

References 

1998 births
Living people
Mexican male sprinters
Paralympic gold medalists for Mexico
Athletes (track and field) at the 2020 Summer Paralympics
Paralympic athletes of Mexico
Paralympic medalists in athletics (track and field)
Medalists at the 2020 Summer Paralympics
Sportspeople from Veracruz
People from Coatzacoalcos
21st-century Mexican people